Argyresthia flexilis is a moth of the family Yponomeutidae first described by Hugh Avery Freeman in 1960. It is found in the United States in northern Montana and probably the adjacent parts of Canada.

The wingspan is about 11 mm. The forewings are yellowish white and the hindwings are smoky. Adults are on wing in late June.

The larvae feed on Pinus flexilis. Late instar larvae tie needles into a bundle and mine two or more of them, starting below the middle of the needle, and mining toward the apex. The frass is ejected through the mine entrance. Full-grown larvae construct a new bundle within which pupation takes place in a dense, white cocoon.

References

Moths described in 1960
Argyresthia
Moths of North America